Alpine Lake is an alpine lake in Custer County, Idaho, United States, located high in the Sawtooth Mountains in the Sawtooth National Recreation Area.

A trail from the Redfish Lake Creek trailhead and campground at the southwestern end of Redfish Lake lead about  along Redfish Creek to an intersection with a trail that leads up to Alpine Lake. The Redfish Lake trailhead can be accessed from State Highway 75 via Sawtooth National Forest road 214.  The surface elevation of the lake is 6,513 feet (1,985 m) above sea level. To reach the Redfish Creek trailhead you can either hike around either side of Redfish Lake or take a boat across and save several miles of hiking.

Alpine Lake is in the Sawtooth Wilderness and wilderness permit can be obtained at trailheads.

References

See also
 List of lakes of the Sawtooth Mountains (Idaho)
 Sawtooth National Forest
 Sawtooth National Recreation Area
 Sawtooth Range (Idaho)

Lakes of Idaho
Lakes of Custer County, Idaho
Glacial lakes of the United States
Glacial lakes of the Sawtooth Wilderness